The 9th Grand Prix de l'Albigeois was a Formula One motor race held on 13 July 1947 at Les Planques circuit in Albi in the Tarn department of France. The winner of the 40 lap race was Louis Rosier in a Talbot-Lago T150SS. Second was Raymond Sommer in a Simca Gordini Type 11 and Charles Pozzi was third in a Delahaye 135. Maserati drivers Henri Louveau and Luigi Villoresi set pole and fastest lap respectively, but both retired.

Results

References

Albi Grand Prix
Albi
Motorsport in France